Maanmizhiyaal is a 1990 Indian Malayalam film, directed by Krishnaswamyand and produced by M. S. Vasavan. The film stars Ashokan, Sithara, Shari and Sukumari in the lead roles. The film has musical score by Murali Sithara.

Cast
Ashokan
Sithara
Shari
Sukumari
Maniyanpilla Raju
Jagannatha Varma
KPAC Sunny
Poojappura Ravi
Baby Jinju as Child Artist

Soundtrack
The music was composed by Murali Sithara and the lyrics were written by Vayalar Madhavankutty.

References

External links
 

1990 films
1990s Malayalam-language films